The Royal Thai Air Force Museum is located in Don Mueang District, Bangkok, Thailand. It is located on the Phahonyothin Road just to the south of Wing 6 of the domestic terminal of the Don Mueang Airport. It was served by the Royal Thai Air Force Museum BTS station since 16 December 2020.

Overview

The museum was established in 1952 to collect, preserve and restore different airplanes and other aviation equipment used by the Royal Thai Air Force. In addition to one F11C and other rare aircraft, the museum's collection also includes one of only 2 surviving Japanese Tachikawa Ki-36 trainers, the last surviving Vought O2U Corsair, one of 3 surviving Curtiss BF2C Goshawks, a Spitfire and several Nieuports and Breguets.

The museum provides details of Thailand's role in World War II. Imperial Japanese forces landed at various points in Thailand on 8 December 1941, and after resisting for one day, the Thai forces were ordered to cease fire and allow Japanese forces to pass through the kingdom. The Thai government of Field Marshal Pibun Songkram would also declare war on both Britain and the United States in January 1942 (though the declaration was never delivered to the US by the Thai ambassador), and Thailand remained technically a Japanese ally until the Japanese surrender in August 1945, despite the existence of a large anti-Japanese underground. The museum contains several paintings of Thai fighter aircraft intercepting attacking US B-29s, P-38s and P-51s.

Renovation
Since 2012, the Royal Thai Air Force Museum has received basic repair. In 2020 Royal Thai Air Force Museum has renovated the museum to renovation of the Air Force Museum building area to prepare for the Royal Thai Air Force Academic Seminar 2020. The objectives of the renovation is for create an understanding of the RTAF Strategic Direction / Position, which recognizes the national defense industry  in accordance with government policy which will lead to concrete Thailand 4.0 and raise awareness in the development of Sustainable and Smart Air Force with transparency and also enhance knowledge in every dimension (All Domains) in the development of the Air Force and listen to opinions from relevant parties to be a guideline for mobilization of national forces For the development of the Air Force.

Aircraft on display

Gallery

See also
List of aerospace museums

References

Notes

External links

Royal Thai Air Force Museum (Archived)
Attractions Weaving (Thai)
List of Airframes
A BRIEFER HISTORY OF THE ROYAL THAI AIR FORCE (Archived)

Military and war museums in Thailand
Museums in Bangkok
Museums established in 1952
Air force museums
Aerospace museums in Thailand
1952 establishments in Thailand
Don Mueang district